My 21st Century Blues is the debut studio album by British singer and songwriter Raye, released through Human Re Sources independently on 3 February 2023. The album is Raye's first project following her departure from Polydor Records in 2021. It is her first body of work released as an independent artist. Largely co-written by Raye with production handled by herself, Mike Sabath, BloodPop, Punctual, and Di Genius, it was met with universal acclaim from critics. The album features guest appearances from 070 Shake and Mahalia,

My 21st Century Blues debuted at number two on the UK Albums Chart, with fewer than 2,500 chart units difference with Shania Twain's Queen of Me. The album was the most-purchased record in independent record shops in the UK. The album charted in 13 other territories, including reaching number 58 on the US Billboard 200.

The album lyrically explores various themes including Raye's own struggles with addiction, insecurity, body dysmorphia, and sexual assault. It was supported by the singles "Hard Out Here", "Black Mascara", "Escapism" (featuring 070 Shake), "The Thrill Is Gone", and "Ice Cream Man". "Escapism" peaked at number one in the UK in January 2023, and entered the top ten in 22 other music markets.

Background 
In a interview for Rolling Stone UK, Raye stated that her debut album features some of her most personal songwriting to date, including her struggles with body dysmorphia, anxiety, and sexual assault. She credits some of songs on her album as helping her as part of her healing process by adding:"Some of these songs have helped me process. I had just been needing to hear them in a more beautiful form. Like "Body Dysmorphia," it sounds so ugly in my head, but when you put it into that song, it makes it a little bit easier for me to digest. A lot of these stories are very medicinal and very raw and therapeutic for me. I think it's been really important for me to take it there, as hard as it's been sometimes."Raye also talked about the first time she self directed a video for the song "Ice Cream Man" which details her experience with sexual assault. My 21st Century Blues also features tracks that were written by Raye from previous years, with many songs being cut from the final tracklist because they didn't fit the theme of the album.

Release and promotion 
In September 2022, Raye went on BBC Radio 1's Live Lounge to perform "Black Mascara" and a cover of Kate Bush's "Running Up That Hill". On 13 October 2022, Raye announced the project on her social media along with the release of the songs "Escapism" and "The Thrill Is Gone". Following the dual release, Raye performed both songs on Later... with Jools Holland. Raye later performed "The Thrill Is Gone" on The Graham Norton Show.

Singles 
On 30 June 2022, Raye released the lead single "Hard Out Here", which was her first independent release following her separation from Polydor Records. The second single, "Black Mascara", was released on 24 August 2022 after previously being teased at the end of the "Hard Out Here" music video, two days before originally scheduled. A dual single release, "Escapism", and "The Thrill Is Gone" was released on 12 October 2022. "Escapism" would later chart at number 1 in the UK Singles Chart. On 2 February 2023, a day before the album release, the fifth single, "Ice Cream Man", premiered on BBC Radio 1 as Radio 1's Hottest Record.

Tours 
In support of the album, Raye embarked on a mini tour in October and November 2022 entitled The Story So Far, which marked her first headlining shows in Europe and North America. The tour consisted of an acoustic, intimate setting with a seated audience and Raye discussing her career in between performances of her discography in chronological order. This will be followed by the My 21st Century Blues tour, which will commence in February 2023. A second European leg was announced in January and will commence in November 2023.

The Story So Far Tour

My 21st Century Blues Tour 

Festivals and other miscellaneous performances
This concert is a part of "Parklife"
This concert is a part of "Tinderbox"
This concert is a part of the "Longitude Festival"
This concert is a part of the "Indiependence Music & Arts Festival"

Critical reception 

My 21st Century Blues received a score of 82 out of 100 based on 12 reviews on review aggregator Metacritic, indicating "universal acclaim". Aggregator AnyDecentMusic? gave it 7.5 out of 10, based on their assessment of the critical consensus.
Writing for Clash, Alex Rigotti felt that "In her haste to tell her story, "My 21st Century Blues" suffers from a frenzied second half that cushions the gut-punch it could have been". Hayley Milross of The Line of Best Fit writes that "My 21st Century Blues will be labelled as an iconic debut" and that "the album has excellent high points [which are] tracks that showcase what brought Raye to the forefront in the first place." Ben Tipple from DIY states that the record "[are] mirroring Raye's desire to explore all facets of herself, and it is autobiographical to its core, whether touching on heartbreak, discrimination, or distorted self-image." Neive McCarthy of Dork called Raye "unstoppable on her latest offering" and added that she's "tackling every hardship that has befallen her of late and doing so with smooth, jazz-leaning vocals and slick beats."

In a positive review for The Guardian, Alexis Petridis writes that "Whatever its failings, though, there's enough in the way of potential hit singles – moreover, potential hit singles with attitude and character to spare – on Raye's debut to ensure that her current success amounts to more than a sympathy vote or a flash in the pan."

Track listing

Charts

Release history

References 

2023 debut albums
Raye (singer) albums
Albums produced by Mike Sabath